The USA Indoor Track and Field Championships is an annual indoor track and field competition organized by USA Track & Field, which serves as the American national championships for the sport. In years which feature a World Indoor Championships in Athletics, the championships serve as a way of selecting the best athletes for those competitions.

Editions

USATF era

TAC era

AAU combined gender era

AAU split gender era

Events
The following athletics events feature on the national championships' program:

 Sprint: 60 m, 200 m, 300 m, 400 m
 Middle-distance track events: 600 m, 800 m, 1000 m, 1500m, Mile
 Long distance track events: 3000 m
 Hurdles: 60 m hurdles
 Jumps: long jump, triple jump, high jump, pole vault
 Throws: shot put, weight throw
 Combined events: heptathlon, pentathlon
 Walks: 3000 m walk, 2 mile walk, 5000 m walk

Championships Records

Men

Women

See also
USA Outdoor Track and Field Championships
USA Marathon Championships
USA Half Marathon Championships
USA Cross Country Championships

References

External links
Official website from USATF
USA Indoor Track & Field Championships Records USATF (2006-01-01)
Past champions USATF (2006-01-01)

 
Track and field competitions in the United States
United States athletics (track and field) championships
Track and field
National indoor athletics competitions